Her Soul (Anima in Italian) is the first play by Italian playwright Amelia Pincherle Rosselli, the grandmother of Italian poet Amelia Rosselli. The play received national acclaim and the Italian state gave the play a national prize.  It was first performed in Turin on October 29, 1898 at the Gerbino Theater, starring Clara Dell Guardia. 

The inspiration for Her Soul was from the 1894 play The Rights of the Soul by Giuseppe Giacosa.

References

Italian plays
1898 plays